The following is a list of Glitch artists working in various media. Glitch artists make art based on errors and faults.

A 

 American Artist
 Mark Amerika
 Kalliope Amorphous

B 

 Michael Betancourt
 Michael Borras AKA Systaime
 Nia Burks

F 

 Jamie Fenton

J 

 Jodi (art collective)

L 

 Eric Leiser

M 

 Rosa Menkman
 monochrom
 Takeshi Murata

N 

 Filippo Nesci

P  
 Sondra Perry

R 

 Casey Reas
 Tabita Rezaire

S 

 Rob Sheridan

T 

 Canan Tolon

Glitch Artists